This is the list of cathedrals in Russia sorted by denomination.

Eastern Orthodox
Cathedrals of the Russian Orthodox Church
Transfiguration Cathedral in Abakan
Cathedral of the Theotokos of Vladimir in Aktubinsk
Cathedral of the Nativity in Alexandrov
Trinity Cathedral in Anadyr
Holy Trinity Co-Cathedral in Angarsk
St. Iliinsky cathedral in Arkhangelsk
St. Michael Cathedral in Arkhangelsk (under re-construction)
Resurrection Cathedral in Arzamas
Assumption Cathedral in Astrakhan
Pokrovsky Cathedral in Barnaul
Cathedral of the Transfiguration in Belgorod
Transfiguration Co-Cathedral in Berdsk
Cathedral of the Annunciation in Birobidzhan
Co-Cathedral of the Assumption in Biysk
Annunciation Cathedral in Blagoveshchensk
Co-Cathedral of the Annunciation in Borovsk
Cathedral of the Bryansk Saints in Bryansk
Vvedensky Cathedral in Cheboksary
St. Simeon Cathedral in Chelyabinsk
Kazan Cathedral  in Chita
Holy Trinity Cathedral in Ekaterinburg
John the Baptist Co-Cathedral in Ekaterinburg
Ascension Co-Cathedral in Elets
Kazan Cathedral in Elista
Church of Our Lady of Kazan in Irkutsk
Transfiguration Cathedral in Ivanovo
St. Alexander Nevsky Cathedral in Izhevsk, built between 1818 and 1823 
Cathedral of Christ the Saviour in Kaliningrad, built between 1995 and 2006
Trinity Cathedral  in Kaluga
Cathedral of St. Nicholas in Kamyshin
Cathedral of St. Nicholas in Kazan
Znamensky Cathedral in Kemerovo
Dormition Cathedral in Khabarovsk, (former cathedral)
Transfiguration Cathedral in Khabarovsk, (current cathedral)
Co-Cathedral of the Assumption of Virgin in Kineshma
Cathedral of Our Lady of Kazan (Kirillov) in Kirillov
Dormition Cathedral of the Trifonov Monastery in Kirov
Cathedral of Sts. Peter and Paul in Klintsy
Bogoyavlensko-Anastasiin Cathedral in Kostroma
St. Catherine's Cathedral in Krasnodar
St. Basil's Cathedral in Krasnoyarsk
Alexander Nevsky Cathedral in Kurgan
Sergiev-Kazan Cathedral in Kursk
Ascension Co-Cathedral in Kuznetsk
Nativity of Christ Cathedral in Lipetsk
Holy Spirit Cathedral in Magadan
Holy Assumption Co-Cathedral in Makhachkala
Holy Assumption Cathedral in Maykop
Bogolyubskii Cathedral in Michurinsk
Ascension Co-Cathedral in Monchegorsk
Cathedral of Christ the Savior in Moscow, originally built between 1839 and 1860, destroyed in 1931, rebuilt between 1994 and 2000
Epiphany Cathedral at Yelokhovo in Moscow
St. Nicholas Cathedral in Murmansk
Cathedral of St. Alexander Nevsky in Nizhny Novgorod
Ascension Co-Cathedral in Novocherkassk
Transfiguration Co-Cathedral in Novokuznetsk
Alexander Nevsky Cathedral in Novosibirsk
Ascension Cathedral in Novosibirsk
Trinity Cathedral in Novosibirsk
Assumption Cathedral in Omsk
Cathedral of St. Nicholas in Orenburg
Akhtyrsky Cathedral in Oryol
Assumption Cathedral in Penza
Holy Trinity Church in Perm
St. Nicholas Cathedral in Petropavlovsk-Kamchatsky
Cathedral of Alexander Nevsky in Petrozavodsk
Holy Trinity Cathedral in Pskov
Assumption Cathedral in Rostov
Virgin Mary's Nativity Church in Rostov-on-Don
Assumption Cathedral in Ryazan
Nativity of Christ Co-Cathedral in Ryazan
Cathedral of Our Lady of Kazan in Saint Petersburg
Holy Trinity Cathedral of the Alexander Nevsky Lavra in Saint Petersburg
Cathedral of the Protection of the Mother of God in Samara
Cathedral of St. Feodor Ushakov in Saransk
Duhososhestvensky Cathedral in Saratov
St. Nicholas Co-Cathedral in Shadrinsk
St. Catherine's Co-Cathedral in Slobodskoy
Assumption Cathedral in Smolensk
St. Andrew's Cathedral in Stavropol
Cathedral of St. Nicholas in Sterlitamak
Virgin Mary's Nativity Co-Cathedral in Suzdal
Stephan's Cathedral in Syktyvkar
Transfiguration Cathedral in Tambov
St. Sophia Cathedral of the Assumption in Tobolsk
Transfiguration Cathedral in Tolyatti
Epiphany Cathedral in Tomsk
All Saints Cathedral in Tula
Znamensky Co-Cathedral in Tyumen
Alexander Nevsky Cathedral in Tver
Holy Resurrection Cathedral in Tver
Holy Life-Giving and Indivisible Trinity Co-Cathedral in Tynda
Sergievsky Cathedral in Ufa
Odigitrievsky Cathedral in Ulan-Ude
Virgin-Neopalimovskiy Cathedral in Ulyanovsk
St. Sophia Cathedral in Veliky Novgorod
Co-Cathedral of the Holy Righteous Procopius in Veliky Ustyug
St. George's Co-Cathedral in Vladikavkaz
Holy Assumption Cathedral in Vladimir
St. Nicholas Cathedral in Vladivostok
Cathedral of Our Lady of Kazan in Volgograd
Cathedral of the Nativity of the Virgin in Vologda
Cathedral of the Annunciation in Voronezh
Transfiguration Cathedral in Yakutsk
Assumption Cathedral in Yaroslavl
Holy Resurrection Cathedral Yuzhno-Sakhalinsk
Ascension Cathedral in Yoshkar-Ola

Roman Catholic
Cathedrals of the Roman Catholic Church in Russia:
 Cathedral of the Immaculate Heart of Mary in Irkutsk
 Cathedral of the Mother of God in Moscow
 Cathedral of Transfiguration in Novosibirsk
 Cathedral of St. Peter and St. Paul in Saratov
 Church of St. James in Yuzhno-Sakhalinsk

Armenian Apostolic
Cathedrals of the Armenian Apostolic Church:
Cathedral of St. Sergius in Sochi

See also

Lists of cathedrals by country
Christianity in Russia

References

 
Russia
Cathedrals
Cathedrals